Tyrinna is a genus of sea slugs, dorid nudibranchs, shell-less marine gastropod mollusks in the family Chromodorididae.

Species
Species in the genus Tyrinna include:

 Tyrinna burnayi (Ortea, 1988) 
 Tyrinna delicata   Bergh, 1898 - synonym Tyrinna nobilis
 Tyrinna evelinae  Marcus, 1958

References

Chromodorididae
Gastropod genera